Rebecca Joshua Okwaci is a South Sudanese politician, and a member of Parliament and the Chief Whip of the Ruling SPLM Party in the Transitional National Legislative Assembly as of 2022. She was the former Minister of Telecommunications and Postal Services and also the former minister of Roads and Bridges in the Government of the Republic of South Sudan. She is a "prolific peace campaigner and advocate of women's roles in peace", and she is a founder member of several Sudanese, South Sudanese or pan-African women's organisations, including being the Secretary-General of Women Action for Development. In December 2013, Jess Mathias of The Guardian described her to be an ideal role model for young girls over traditionally idolised women such as Rihanna and Beyoncé.

Early Life

Education
Okwaci earned a bachelor's degree in English language, literature, and translation from Egypt's Alexandria University, followed by a master's degree in communication development from Kenya's Daystar University.

Journalist
Okwaci, during the second Sudanese civil war in 1986, joined the newly-formed Sudan People's Liberation Movement and began working as a journalist for Radio SPLA, where she became known as the "voice of the revolution".

Politician
In January 2015, Okwaci signed an agreement with her Kenyan counterpart Fred Matiangi to lay 600 kilometres of fibre optic cable alongside a proposed Juba-Nadapal-Eldoret road. Okwaci led the South Sudan delegation, and said that this cable would improve South Sudan's connectivity with the rest of the world, and would "spur development, create job opportunities, and bring about peace and stability". The cable laying is expected to be finished earlier than the projected road completion date of 2022.

Women's rights and peace activism
Okwaci is a founding member of several organisations, the Sudanese Women Association, based in Nairobi, Sudanese Women Voice for Peace, and Sudanese Women Empowerment for Peace. She is the Secretary-General of Women Action for Development (WAD).

References

Living people
South Sudanese politicians
South Sudanese women in politics
South Sudanese journalists
South Sudanese women's rights activists
Year of birth missing (living people)
Daystar University alumni
South Sudanese women journalists